Brimfield Township is one of the eighteen townships in Portage County, Ohio, United States. The 2020 census found 11,352 people in the township.

Geography
Located in the southwestern part of the county, it borders the following townships and cities:
Franklin Township - north
Kent - north
Ravenna Township - northeast corner
Rootstown Township - east
Randolph Township - southeast corner
Suffield Township - south
Springfield Township, Summit County - southwest corner
Tallmadge - west
Stow - northwest corner

The census-designated place of Brimfield is located in the center of the township.

In addition, parts of two neighboring cities cover land that was once part of the township:
Part of the city of Kent, in the north
Part of the city of Tallmadge, in the west

Name and history

The township is named after the town of Brimfield, Massachusetts, and is the only Brimfield Township in Ohio. It was formed from survey township Town 2, Range 9 of the Connecticut Western Reserve. The original proprietors were Israel Thorndike of Boston and John Wyles of Hartford, Connecticut, both of whom came to the area in 1816 to view their land and divide it.  While neither settled in Brimfield, Thorndike sent his nephew Henry Thorndike to act as his agent and settle in the township. Brimfield was known by a succession of different names during the first few years, mostly in reference the swampy land within its borders.  It was first known as "Swamptown", followed by "Beartown", "Greenbriar", and "Wylestown", before town leaders agreed to name it "Thorndike" at the establishment of the township government in 1818 after Thorndike had agreed to donate land for a town square. Thorndike never followed through on his agreement, so residents petitioned to have the name changed to "Brimfield" in honor of John Wyles, Jr., who had inherited his father's land interests and at the time resided in Brimfield, Massachusetts. A post office called Brimfield was established in 1834 and remained in operation until 1907.

Government
The township is governed by a three-member board of trustees, who are elected in November of odd-numbered years to a four-year term beginning on the following January 1. Two are elected in the year after the presidential election and one is elected in the year before it. There is also an elected township fiscal officer, who serves a four-year term beginning on April 1 of the year after the election, which is held in November of the year before the presidential election. Vacancies in the fiscal officership or on the board of trustees are filled by the remaining trustees.

References

External links

Townships in Portage County, Ohio
1816 establishments in Ohio
Populated places established in 1816
1818 establishments in Ohio
Populated places established in 1818
Townships in Ohio